The visa policy of Hong Kong deals with the requirements in which a foreign national wishing to enter Hong Kong through one of the 15 immigration control points must meet to obtain an entry permit (permit to enter) or Visa, which depending on the traveller's nationality, may be required to travel to, enter, and remain in the Hong Kong Special Administrative Region. Visitors from over 145 countries are permitted without Visa entry for periods ranging from 7 to 180 days, to the Hong Kong Special Administrative Region for tourism or certain business-related activities. All visitors must hold a passport valid for more than 1 month.

Unless having the right to land or right of abode in Hong Kong, nationals of all countries and territories require entry permits or visas from the Hong Kong Immigration Department directly or via one of the Chinese diplomatic missions overseas, to undertake other activities, such as study, employment, or operation of a business. Under the one country, two systems policy, Hong Kong maintains its immigration and visa policy independently from the rest of China. Consequently, entering Hong Kong from mainland China or Macau requires passing through immigration checkpoints of mainland China or Macau. Whilst Macau residents have visa-free access for short visits to Hong Kong, Mainland residents must obtain a Two-way Permit (EEP) with the appropriate exit endorsement from the Chinese Ministry of Public Security before visiting Hong Kong.

Due to the historical background of Hong Kong, immigration status in Hong Kong is determined by a combination of both nationality and residence status. Therefore, even a Chinese national with the right of abode in Hong Kong has a slightly different status to a foreign national with the right of abode in Hong Kong as well (since the former can never lose the right of abode status while the latter can lose it if they do not enter Hong Kong for a period of 36 months). At the same time, a foreign national with the right of abode in Hong Kong has a preferential immigration status to a Chinese national without the right of abode in Hong Kong, as the former can remain in Hong Kong indefinitely, while the latter has to have his immigration status reassessed whenever his visa/permit expires.

Unconditional stay 
Persons with the "right of abode" or the "right to land" may enter Hong Kong without holding any visa and without having any condition of stay imposed upon them, and may not be subject to a removal order. In addition, no deportation order may be imposed on a person with the right of abode. No visa or entry permit is required for holders of the following travel document:
 Hong Kong Permanent Identity Card
 Hong Kong Identity Card with 'R' or 'U' code.
 Hong Kong Special Administrative Region Passport
 British National (Overseas) passport (Note: No longer recognized by the HKSAR government for immigration clearance and identification purposes only from 31 January 2021, which has no effect on the immigration status of BN(O) in Hong Kong.)
 Hong Kong Certificate of Identity (all of which have expired by 30 June 2007)
 Hong Kong Re-entry Permit (for entry from China and Macao only)
 Hong Kong Seaman's Identity Book
 Hong Kong Document of Identity for Visa Purposes, provided that the document is valid or the holder's limit of stay in Hong Kong has not expired
 Any travel document bearing an endorsement stating either Holder's eligibility for Hong Kong permanent identity card verified or The holder of this travel document has the right to land in Hong Kong. (Section 2AAA, Immigration Ordinance (cap. 115, Laws of Hong Kong))

Visitor visa exemptions
Nationals of the following countries as well as Macau permanent residents can enter Hong Kong without a visa for tourism or business-related purposes. For business visits, they can undertake a limited range of business-related activities, namely "concluding contracts or submitting tenders, examining or supervising the installation/packaging of goods or equipment, participating in exhibitions or trade fairs (except selling goods or supplying services direct to the general public, or constructing exhibition booths), settling compensation or other civil proceedings, participating in product orientation, and attending short-term seminars or other business meetings". They are prohibited from taking up employment or study in the territory, or from "establishing or joining in any business". The last provision means that non-residents may not commence operating a business while in Hong Kong, and thus will be refused permission for business registration by the Inland Revenue Department unless it can be proven that the business began operation while they were outside of Hong Kong. However, the Companies Registry permits non-residents to incorporate limited liability companies and to be appointed as corporate directors (though not as corporate secretaries).

Visa-free entry applies to holders of national passports only. Furthermore, the Hong Kong Immigration Department has restrictions for holders of certain types of passports, even when the holder's nationality itself provides visa-free entry.

Visa policy map

Visa exempt

Visitor visa exemptions for diplomatic or official passports only
Holders of diplomatic or official passports issued by the following countries can enter Hong Kong without a visa for 14 days:

Visa required nationals

Visa required
Stateless travel document holders and nationals of the following countries are required to possess a visa for any type of entry into Hong Kong (including as tourists), but are not required to have a visa to transit airside if they remain within the airport transit area:

1 - except for holders of diplomatic or official passports.
2 - diplomatic passports only.

Transit visa required
Nationals of the following countries are required to possess a visa for any type of entry into Hong Kong (including as tourists) and for transit airside (even if they remain within the airport transit area):

1 - except for holders of diplomatic or official passports.

Mainland China, Macau, and Taiwan
Special rules are in force for nationals of China and Taiwan who do not reside in Hong Kong.

Overview

Mainland China
Chinese nationals with hukou in Mainland China are required to obtain an entry permit from the Public Security Bureau for any type of visit to Hong Kong (Two-way Permit required for short visits and long visits, or One-way Permit for settlement), as well as an entry endorsement (similar to a visa) for the purpose of travel. The duration of stay is usually 7 days per trip.

Holders of Chinese passports are granted a stay of 7 days providing they are transiting to a third country (including Macau and Taiwan).

Chinese nationals residing in a third country may apply for the HKSAR Entry Permit, affixed on their Chinese passports, from Chinese diplomatic missions. The duration of stay varies, but is usually 14 days or 30 days for short-term visitors.

Macau
Chinese nationals with the right of abode in Macao can enter Hong Kong visa-free for a maximum period of 180 days solely with their Macao permanent identity card. Non-permanent residents of Macao can enter for up to 30 days if they hold a Visit Permit for Residents of Macao SAR to Hong Kong SAR.

Holders of MSAR passports or MSAR Travel Permits are granted a stay of 7 days providing they are transiting to a third country.

Republic of China (Taiwan)
Since 27 April 2009, ROC nationals with right of abode in Taiwan ("right of abode" is defined as the eligibility of obtaining a Taiwanese National ID Card) holding a Mainland Travel Permit for Taiwan Residents may enter Hong Kong for up to 30 days without obtaining an entry permit in advance.

Otherwise, a valid entry permit must be applied in advance. Previously only airlines and appointed travel agents are authorised to this application while a fee of HKD50 applies. Since 1 September 2012, ROC nationals with ROA in Taiwan may complete the application for Pre-arrival Registration (PAR) online, free of charge, if they fulfill the following criteria:  
were born in Taiwan or were born outside Taiwan but have been admitted to Hong Kong as a Taiwan resident before; and,
are not in possession of any travel document issued by other countries or regions (except Mainland Travel Permit for Taiwan Residents, and Entry Permit issued by the Immigration Department of Hong Kong). Those who do are not allowed to use their Taiwan passports for entry and instead will have to visit Hong Kong on the strength of their other passports.

After the applicant has successfully registered for PAR, he or she will have to print out the "Notification Slip for Pre-arrival Registration for Taiwan Residents" and carry it when boarding the flight to Hong Kong. The applicant's Taiwan passport is then inspected, along with the notification slip, by an immigration officer. Each PAR is valid for two months from the day of registration and good for two trips to Hong Kong. The duration of each stay is 30 days.

ROC nationals without right of abode in Taiwan (commonly known as nationals without household registration) are not eligible for entry permits issued by the HKSAR government, nor are they allowed to enter with their ROC passport. Instead, they are required to obtain a passport-like Chinese Travel Document and a HKSAR Entry Permit issued by the Chinese diplomatic missions overseas.

ROC nationals who are in transit to a third country are exempt from obtaining an entry permit provided that they do not leave the airport transit area, regardless of whether they have right of abode in Taiwan.

Admission refused
Entry and transit is refused to  passport holders, even if not leaving the aircraft and proceeding by the same flight.

Admission refused due political conflicts
Since 2014, Hong Kong has refused some foreign politicians from entering the territory especially those from United States, Japan and Taiwan.

Since 2021, the Commissioner of the Immigration Department can request airlines to refuse specific passenger from entering to Hong Kong.

APEC Business Travel Card
Holders of passports issued by the following countries who possess an APEC Business Travel Card (ABTC) containing the code "HKG" on the back of the card can enter visa-free for business trips for up to 60 days.

ABTCs are issued to nationals of:

ABTCs are also issued to nationals of China and Taiwan, however Chinese nationals residing in Mainland China are subject to entry restrictions and cannot use the card to enter Hong Kong. Taiwanese nationals are also ineligible and are required to travel with a Mainland Travel Permit or a passport with pre-arrival registration.

Types of non-visitor visas
Persons without the right of abode or right to land in Hong Kong, regardless of their nationality, require visas if they wish to take up residence in the territory. Persons granted these visas become "non-permanent residents". Immigration Department policy places restrictions on the ability of nationals of Afghanistan, Cambodia, Cuba, Laos, Nepal, North Korea, and Vietnam to apply for most kinds of visas.

Employment, investment, and study visas
Hong Kong has a number of visas issued for the purpose of allowing the holder to take up employment or employment-related training:
Employment as Professionals (EAP): subdivided into the Immigration Arrangement for Non-local Graduates (IANG, for non-local students who have received a degree in a Hong Kong tertiary institution), the General Employment Policy (GEP, for non-Chinese nationals as well as Chinese nationals who have resided outside mainland China for more than one year), and the Admission Scheme for Mainland Talents and Professionals (ASMTP, for Chinese nationals with household registration in mainland China). GEP and ASMTP entrants require permission from the Immigration Department to change employers; IANG entrants do not.
Training: for periods of up to 12 months. Applications from Chinese nationals with household registration in mainland China are generally not entertained, unless the sponsoring company is multinational and well-established in Hong Kong.
Working Holiday Scheme (WHS), allowing persons between the ages of 18 and 30 to come to Hong Kong for up to 12 months. There is an annual quota of visas, per nationality: Australia (5,000), Austria (100), Canada (200), France (750), Germany (300), Ireland (200), Japan (1,500), South Korea (1,000), New Zealand (400), and the United Kingdom (1,000); other nationalities are not eligible. Participants are required to adhere to the specific terms imposed on them based on their nationality. 
Employment as imported workers, also known as Supplementary Labour Scheme (SLS): for work at the "technician level or below". Change of employment not permitted. Employer must pay a HK$400/month levy for up to 24 months.
Employment as domestic helpers: see foreign domestic helpers in Hong Kong.
Descendants of Hong Kong residents who immigrated overseas, also known as Admission Scheme for the Second Generation of Chinese Hong Kong Permanent Residents (ASSG): for children of Hong Kong permanent residents of Chinese descent. Applicants must be born "overseas" (i.e., in a country other than mainland China, Hong Kong, Macau or Taiwan), are between 18 and 40 years old at the time of application, and have acceptable education backgrounds as well as language skills. Admitted persons do not have any restrictions of stay other than time limitations, and are allowed to take any jobs or start businesses. It is worth noting that certain people who fall into this category may already have right of abode or right to land in Hong Kong due to residual rules before 1997.

The immigration department also grants student visas for persons wishing to study in registered private (non-public, non-aided) primary and secondary schools, and for various types of study at the degree level (short courses, exchange programmes, and certificate or degree courses). Taiwanese and Chinese residents of mainland China and Macau (only for those who moved from mainland China and settled later than 14 January 1979) are only granted visas to study in tertiary-level courses, short-term studies or exchange programmes. Since the 2008/09 academic year, student visa holders in degree courses of more than a year's duration at tertiary institutions may take up short-term internships; other student visa holders are prohibited from taking up any employment at all.

Other types of visas include the Capital Investment Entrant Scheme (CIES) visa (suspended since 15 January 2015), the Quality Migrant Admission Scheme (QMAS) visa, and the investment visa.

Nationals of Afghanistan, Cuba and North Korea are not eligible for any of the visas listed above; nationals of Cambodia, Laos, Nepal and Vietnam are only eligible for CIES.

Dependent visas
Persons on unconditional stay, as well as those granted visas for study, training, employment as professionals, investment, or under CIES or QMAS, may sponsor their spouse and dependent children under the age of 18 for entry into Hong Kong. Persons on unconditional stay may additionally sponsor elderly dependent parents who are over the age of 60. However, persons on unconditional stay cannot sponsor Chinese nationals with household registration in mainland China or Macau residents who immigrated to Macau through "channels other than the One-way Permit scheme" as dependents with few exceptions. Additionally, nationals of Afghanistan and North Korea are not eligible for dependent visas. Dependent visa holders whose sponsor (parent or spouse, as the case may be) holds a study visa require prior permission from the Immigration Department to take up employment; other dependent visa holders may work or switch jobs without prior approval.

Unlike Hong Kong residents in opposite-sex marriages, Hong Kong residents in same-sex marriages with non-Hong Kong residents cannot sponsor their partners for dependent visas. However, according to a July 2011 report by the South China Morning Post, the Hong Kong Immigration Department has an unpublicised policy of granting extended visitors' visas to non-Hong Kong residents in same-sex marriages with Hong Kong residents. This allows them to stay in the city for de facto family reunification, though they cannot take up employment, will not receive a Hong Kong Identity Card, and while holding a visitor's visa will not be regarded as "ordinarily resident" in Hong Kong for purposes of permanent residency applications. However, they may renew their visas without departing from Hong Kong.

Visitor statistics
Most visitors arriving to Hong Kong were from the following country or territory of residence:

See also 

 Exit & Entry Permit (Republic of China)
 Visa requirements for Chinese citizens of Hong Kong
 Visa policy of Macau
 Visa policy of China
 Immigration Ordinance

Notes

References

Further reading 
 Boehler, Patrick and Saikou Ceesay. "West Africa a shortcut for rich mainland Chinese to Hong Kong residency." South China Morning Post. Thursday 20 June 2013.

External links 

 Immigration Department of Hong Kong SAR

China, Hong Kong
Tourism in Hong Kong
Foreign relations of Hong Kong